Roberto Cezar Lima Acunha (born July 7, 1986) is a former Brazilian football player.

Playing career
He played for J2 League club Sagan Tosu in 2005 season. On August 6, he debuted in J2 League against Vegalta Sendai. However he could only play this match and left the club end of the season.

Club statistics

References

External links

footballjapan.jp

1986 births
Living people
Brazilian footballers
Brazilian expatriate footballers
Expatriate footballers in Japan
J2 League players
Sagan Tosu players
Association football midfielders